Dryaglovsky is a rural locality (a khutor) in Uspenskoye Rural Settlement, Nekhayevsky District, Volgograd Oblast, Russia. The population was 12 as of 2010.

Geography 
Dryaglovsky is located on the Kalach Upland, 45 km northwest of Nekhayevskaya (the district's administrative centre) by road. Uspenka is the nearest rural locality.

References 

Rural localities in Nekhayevsky District